Tan Teʼ Kʼinich was a Maya king of the ancient city of Aguateca, in the Petén Department of modern Guatemala.

Biography
He was born on January 22, 748. His father was the king Uchaʼan Kʼan Bʼalam.

Aguateca Stela 19 records a battle that he fought in 778 and also mentions his father.

In 802 Tan Teʼ Kʼinich presided over a ceremony performed by Lachan Kʼawiil Ajaw Bot at La Amelia.

Notes

References

External links
Tan Teʼ Kʼinich at Mesoweb

Kings of Aguateca
8th century in Guatemala